HMS Knaresborough Castle (K389) was a  of the Royal Navy, built under the 1943 War Programme, and named after Knaresborough Castle in Yorkshire, England.

She was ordered on 19 January 1943, launched at Blyth Shipyard in Blyth, Northumberland on 29 September 1943 and completed on 5 April 1944. She was scrapped at Glasgow in March 1956. The ship's bell hangs in St John's Church of England Primary school in Knaresborough, North Yorkshire, England.

In World War II she served as a convoy escort.

In 1953 she took part in the Fleet Review to celebrate the Coronation of Queen Elizabeth II.

References

Publications

 

Castle-class corvettes
1943 ships